Azriel Gonzalez (born May 24, 2001) is an American professional soccer player for Las Vegas Lights in the USL Championship.

Early life
Gonzalez has been with the Seattle Sounders FC academy since 2015 when he was 13.  In 2016, Gonzalez's first full season in the academy, Gonzalez scored 12 goals and 6 assists in 18 matches with the U-16s.  In that same season, the team won the Youdan Trophy, a tournament held in Sheffield, England, with Gonzalez earning Golden Boot honors after scoring five goals and two assists in five matches.

Club career
On April 25, 2017, Gonzalez made his debut for USL club Seattle Sounders FC 2 (later renamed Tacoma Defiance) in a 3–2 defeat to San Antonio FC.  He was subbed in at the 71st minute but was sent off after receiving a straight red card for a two-footed, sliding challenge in stoppage time.  On June 3, 2017, he logged his first assist, the game-winning goal, in a 3–0 victory over LA Galaxy II.  On July 17, 2017, he officially signed with Sounders FC 2, moving from the Seattle Sounders FC's academy to their USL team, and became the youngest player in club history to sign a professional contract.  On July 20, 2017, Gonzalez made his first professional start, playing the full 90 minutes, in a 2–0 defeat to Swope Park Rangers.  On July 23, 2017, after making his second professional start, he was substituted off in the 43rd minute after he sustained a right lateral ankle sprain.

The 2017 season marked the first time that Gonzalez had trained with Sounders' first team.  Gonzalez spent time with the first team during its preseason, training in Seattle and traveling with the team to Tucson, Arizona for preseason friendlies. He again joined the Sounders' first team with preseason training in Chula Vista, California before the start of the 2018 season with a number of other academy players.

On August 11, 2021, he joined FC Edmonton of the Canadian Premier League on loan.

In April 2022, Gonzalez signed with York United on a one-year contract, with club options, and was immediately loaned to FC Edmonton. In December 2022, York United declined Gonzalez's option for 2023.

Gonzalez was announced as a new signing for USL Championship side Las Vegas Lights on January 25, 2023.

International career
Gonzalez has represented the United States a number of times playing at the U-16 level.

Style of play
A quick, skillful and creative player, Gonzalez is capable of playing in several offensive positions. He is usually deployed as a winger or as an attacking midfielder, and has even been used as a lone striker. His club manager Ezra Hendrickson described him as "a gifted and motivated player with great instincts and technical abilities" and later described Gonzalez as "an excellent finisher and very good at 1v1 defending". When describing himself, he stated, "I'm a player that tries to take players on and am confident with the ball".

Notes

References

External links
US Soccer Development Academy bio

Sounders FC player profile

2001 births
Living people
American soccer players
Association football midfielders
Soccer players from Las Vegas
Sportspeople from Las Vegas
American sportspeople of Mexican descent
USL Championship players
Canadian Premier League players
Tacoma Defiance players
FC Edmonton players
York United FC players
Las Vegas Lights FC players
American expatriate soccer players
American expatriate sportspeople in Canada
Expatriate soccer players in Canada